Christos Karipidis (born 2 December 1982) is a Greek former professional footballer who played as a centre back.

Club career

Early Career (PAOK, Kerkyra and Kavala)
Karipidis started his career in U20 PAOK in 2000 to be promoted the next season in the first team. PAOK has given him to Kavala (2001–2002) and to Kerkyra (2002–2003). He returned to PAOK, where he stayed until 2006 (69 appearances, 3 goals in all competitions) when he made the big step to play abroad accepting the proposal of Hearts.

Hearts
He joined Hearts from PAOK on 3 August 2006 for a fee of around £200,000. Karipidis made his Hearts debut against AEK Athens in a third-round UEFA Champions League qualifier at Murrayfield on 9 August 2006 in a defensive midfield role, Hearts lost the game 2–1.

In August 2008 Karipidis looked set for a return to his former club PAOK following an indifferent start to his Hearts career and the birth of his daughter. Hearts negotiated a fee in the region of £200,000 as they looked to recoup the fee they paid to sign him from the Greek club 2 years earlier and he was offered a four-year deal by PAOK.
However, newly appointed manager Csaba László convinced Karipidis to stay and decided to use him as a holding midfielder, an idea which was initially met with a negative reaction by Hearts fans. Karipidis himself insisted he was happy to play anywhere László decided. Despite having played most of his career as either a central defender or occasionally a right-back Karipidis performed well in his new role, prompting László to say "Karipidis, at the moment, is the discovery of the year in the number six position."

In February 2009, captain Christophe Berra signed for Wolves and Karipidis was made Hearts' vice-captain after teammate Robbie Neilson was given the captaincy.

On 27 April 2009 Hearts announced that Karipidis had a pre-contract agreement with Omonia Nicosia which would see him join the Cypriot side on a three-year deal at the end of the season. He stated that although he had enjoyed his time in Scotland, the move was motivated by his desire to be closer to his home and relatives in Greece. His final appearance at Tynecastle came in a 3–0 victory over Dundee United which confirmed Hearts' place in the Europa League for the following season and third place in the SPL. He was replaced by Jason Thomson in the closing stages of the match and received a standing ovation from the Hearts fans.

Cyprus (Omonia / APOEL / Apollon)
Omonia announced the signing of Karipidis on 1 June 2009. His first season wasn't good enough with Christos having problems to settle, but he had a solid second season and he became the defensive leader of the team. After the end of the season he was named new season's vice captain. On 22 August 2012, his contract at Omonia terminated by mutual consent.

On 26 August 2012, Karipidis signed a two-year contract with APOEL. At the end of the season, he became a champion after helping APOEL to win the 2012–13 Cypriot First Division. On 10 July 2013, his contract with APOEL was mutually terminated.

On 11 July 2013, Karipidis signed a one-year contract with the option of a further season with Apollon Limassol.

Rerurn to Greece
After five years playing among the top clubs in Cyprus, Karipidis returned to Greece signing a two years' contract with Skoda Xanthi. After two years he mutually settled his contract with the club.

On 4 June 2016, he signed a year contract with Platanias for an undisclosed fee.

International career
Karipidis was a part of the Greece football squad at the 2004 Summer Olympics, but he did not play a single minute in the competition.

Karipidis had a good start with the 2008-09 season former Hearts player and current technical director of the Hellenic Football Federation, when Takis Fyssas announced that Karipidis was in the plans of the Greece national team.

Personal life 

He hails from Anagennisi, Serres.

Honours
 Omonia
Cypriot First Division: 1
2009–10
Cypriot Cup: 2
2010–11, 2011–12
LTV Super Cup: 1
2010

 APOEL
Cypriot First Division: 1
2012–13

References

External links
APOEL official profile

Player statistics at londonhearts

1982 births
Living people
Association football defenders
Footballers from Thessaloniki
Olympic footballers of Greece
Footballers at the 2004 Summer Olympics
Greek footballers
Greek expatriate footballers
Greek expatriate sportspeople in Cyprus
PAOK FC players
Kavala F.C. players
A.O. Kerkyra players
Heart of Midlothian F.C. players
AC Omonia players
APOEL FC players
Apollon Limassol FC players
Xanthi F.C. players
Platanias F.C. players
PAS Lamia 1964 players
Expatriate footballers in Scotland
Expatriate footballers in Cyprus
Super League Greece players
Cypriot First Division players
Scottish Premier League players
PAOK FC non-playing staff